Harry Graham (22 November 1870 – 7 February 1911) was an Australian cricket player – a right-handed batsman, who played six Test matches for Australia, and also played cricket for New Zealand – and an Australian rules footballer who played for the Melbourne Football Club in the Victorian Football League (VFL).

Family
The son of James Graham (1839–1911), and Mary Theresa Graham (1846–1886), née Lauder, he was born in Carlton on 22 November 1870.

Cricket
He was taught to play cricket at Berwick Grammar School, by its owner/founder Edward Antonio Lloyd Vieusseux (1854–1917). On leaving school Graham joined the South Melbourne Cricket Club; he later moved to the Melbourne Cricket Club (1894/1895) and, finally, to the Carlton Cricket Club.
 
Known affectionately as "the Little Dasher", Graham scored a century on his Test debut in 1893 at Lord's, and scored 107 in his first Test on home soil, in Sydney. He was only the third player to score a century on Test debut, and the first player to score a century in the second innings on Test debut.

Football
Recruited from the Marylebone Football Club, Graham was a leading Australian rules footballer, playing for Melbourne Football Club, firstly in the Victorian Football Association for a number of years, where he was runner-up in the goal kicking in 1892 with 42 goals.

He made a comeback in 1900, playing two games for the Melbourne First XVIII in the new Victorian Football League: the first against Essendon, on 30 June 1900 (round 9), in which he played well and scored one goal, and the second against Carlton, on 7 July 1900 (round 10), in which he scored two goals.

New Zealand
After he retired from first-class cricket in Australia, in 1903 Graham accepted the post of coach at Otago Boys' High School in Dunedin. He also played several times for Otago in first-class matches from 1903–04 to 1906–07, but without reproducing the brilliance of his Australian form.

Death
"In his later years Graham was gripped with alcoholism and mental illness and he was committed to an asylum near Dunedin, New Zealand in 1907 where he remained until his death". On 7 February 1911, eleven weeks past his 40th birthday, Harry Graham died in Seacliff, a small village in the Otago region of New Zealand's South Island: "Weak in health and weak in mind for some time past, [his] death was not unexpected".

See also
 List of Victoria first-class cricketers
 List of Otago representative cricketers

References

Further reading
 Cardwell, Ronald, Harry Graham: The Little Dasher, The Cricket Publishing Company, (West Pennant Hills), 2017. 
 Coverdale, Brydon, "Australia's Winter Allrounders: XI Test Cricketers who played Australian Rules football at the highest level", Cricinfo, 28 May 2007.
 Hope, Ben, "Club finds Link to early Test Great", The Berwick Gazette, 20 January 2010.

External links

 
 

1870 births
1911 deaths
Australia Test cricketers
Otago cricketers
Victoria cricketers
Pre-1930 New Zealand representative cricketers
Melbourne Football Club players
Cricketers from Melbourne
Melbourne Cricket Club cricketers
Cricketers who made a century on Test debut
Australian rules footballers from Victoria (Australia)
Australian cricketers
Melbourne Football Club (VFA) players
South Island cricketers